Melangyna fisherii, the large-spotted halfband, is a species of syrphid fly in the family Syrphidae. It is found in nearctic North America

References

Syrphinae
Syrphini
Articles created by Qbugbot
Insects described in 1911